Pope Abraham of Alexandria, was the 62nd Pope of Alexandria and Patriarch of the See of St. Mark. He is considered a saint by the Coptic Orthodox Church. He is also referred to as Efrem or Ephrem.

Early life 
Abraham was Syrian by birth. He was a wealthy merchant who visited Egypt several times, and finally stayed there, residing in Alexandria. He was known for his goodness, devoutness, and love of the poor. After his ordination, he distributed half of his wealth to the needy and used the other half for building pools throughout Egypt, including the pool of Saint Mercurius Church in Coptic Cairo.

Election 
During the reign of Al-Muizz – who was the first Fatimid ruler of Egypt – the Islamic government was ambivalent in its treatment of the Copts, alternating sympathy and abuse with atrocity and brutality. At that time, St. Mark's Seat had been vacant for about two years. Finally the bishops and Coptic community leaders assembled in the Church of St. Serguis and Bacchus in Cairo in order to choose possible candidates. While they were convening, Abraham the Syrian, a man devoted to religion and piety, entered the church. One of the assembled turned to a bishop and said that if the bishop were looking for a candidate for the patriarchate, God had sent them a candidate. The whole group assembled was impressed by the selection, and they unanimously decided to elect him. They then took the protesting Abraham in iron fetters to Alexandria, where he was consecrated as the 62nd Patriarch of Alexandria.

Patriarchate
Immediately upon taking office, Abraham suppressed the practice of simony which had become a significant problem during the last several patriarchates. He then turned his attention to the often degraded morals of the church archons, who frequently kept concubines as well as their legal wives. He went so far as to threaten anyone continuing to violate the sanctity of marriage with excommunication.

Death
Pope Abraham the Syrian died on 3 December 978 A.D.

See also
Saint Simon the Tanner
Al-Muizz Lideenillah

References

978 deaths
10th-century Christian saints
10th-century Coptic Orthodox popes of Alexandria
Marian visionaries
Copts from the Fatimid Caliphate